The Collier-Lane-Crichlow House is a historic house in Murfreesboro, Tennessee, U.S.. It was built circa 1850 for architect Sterling P. Jones, who designed in the Federal, Georgian and Greek Revival architectural styles. It was purchased by brothers Jessie A. Collier and Newton C. Collier in 1858. Four of Murfreesboro's mayors from the Collier-Crichlow family lived in the house: Ingram Collier, Newton B. Collier, James H. Crichlow Jr., and N. Collier Crichlow. It was restored by new homeowners in 1975. It has been listed on the National Register of Historic Places since August 23, 1978.

References

Houses on the National Register of Historic Places in Tennessee
Houses completed in 1850
Buildings and structures in Murfreesboro, Tennessee